The Mexican horned lizard (Phrynosoma taurus) is a horned lizard species native to  Mexico. Horned lizards are sometimes referred to as "horned toads" or "horny toads", although they are not toads. Compared to other members of the horned lizards (genus Phrynosoma), little is known about this species.

Geographic range
It is known to live in the Sierra Madre del Sur mountains, south and southeast of Mexico City, in the states of Guerrero and Puebla, Mexico. Its range partially overlaps with that of Phrynosoma braconnieri.

Habitat 
The Mexican horned lizard is a terrestrial species found in arid scrub, high desert, and even tropical dry forest. Phrynosoma taurus can also persist in traditional pastures.

Reproduction
Phrynosoma taurus is viviparous like some horned lizards (Phrynosoma hernandezi, Phrynosoma orbiculare and others).

References

Phrynosoma
Reptiles of Mexico
Reptiles described in 1873
Taxa named by Alfredo Dugès